Muž z neznáma is a 1939 Czech drama film directed by Martin Frič.

Cast
 Zdeněk Štěpánek
 Jiřina Štěpničková
 Zvonimir Rogoz
 Karel Cerný
 Karel Dostal
 Jaroslav Průcha
 Božena Šustrová
 František Kreuzmann
 Jarmila Holmová
 Vladimír Šmeral
 Jaroslav Vojta

References

External links
 

1939 films
1939 drama films
1930s Czech-language films
Czechoslovak black-and-white films
Films directed by Martin Frič
Czechoslovak drama films
1930s Czech films